Meydavud Rural District is a rural district (dehestan) in Meydavud District, Bagh-e Malek County, Khuzestan Province, Iran. At the 2006 census, its population was 8,768, in 1,808 families.  The rural district has 16 villages.

References 

Rural Districts of Khuzestan Province
Bagh-e Malek County